Saint Derchairthinn or Tarcairteann (fl 6th century) is venerated as a prioress and saint of the monastery of Oughter Ard in Ardclough, County Kildare.
Her feast day is March 8.

Lineage
She was said to be “of the race of Colla Uais, Monarch of Érinn”.

References

External links
 Kildare heritage

6th-century Irish abbots
Medieval Irish saints
Medieval saints of Leinster
6th-century Irish nuns
Irish Roman Catholic abbesses
Irish folklore
6th-century Christian saints
Female saints of medieval Ireland